Gëzim Erebara (19 May 1929 – 12 February 2007) was an Albanian film director, screen player, translator and cinematography historian of the second half of the 20th century. He studied at the Prague Academy of Fine Arts in 1947–51 but was repatriated few months before graduation for political reasons by the then Communist Government of Albania. 
He worked in the state owned "Kinostudioja Shqiperia e Re" from 1957 to 1986 and authored or co-authored some of the most important movies.

Filmography

Debatik - (1961) co-authored
Ngadhnjim mbi vdekjen - (1967) co-authored
Guximtarët - (1970)
Në fillim të verës - (1975)
Pylli i lirisë - (1976)
Vajzat me kordele të kuqe - (1978)
Nusja - (1980)
Një natë pa dritë - (1981)
Fushë e blertë-fushë e kuqe - (1984)
Një jetë më shumë - (1986)

1929 births
2007 deaths
Albanian film directors
Academy of Fine Arts, Prague alumni
Czech–Albanian translators
20th-century translators